Leader of Akali Dal  Parkash Singh Badal became chief minister. Badal was sworn as chief minister on 23 June 1977. His ministry was dismissed on 17 February 1980.

Cabinet minister

Ministers of State

References

1977 in Indian politics
Badal 02
1970s in Punjab, India
Shiromani Akali Dal ministries
1977 establishments in Punjab, India
1980 disestablishments in India
Cabinets established in 1977
Cabinets disestablished in 1980